A pistol is a handgun, The English word was introduced in , when early handguns were produced in Europe, and is derived from the Middle French pistolet, meaning a small gun or knife.  In colloquial usage, the word "pistol" is often used to describe any type of handgun, inclusive of revolvers (which have a single barrel and a separate cylinder housing multiple chambers) and the pocket-sized derringers (which are often multi-barrelled).

The most common type of pistol used in the contemporary era is the semi-automatic pistol, while the older single-shot and manual repeating pistols are now rarely seen and used primarily for nostalgic hunting and historical reenactment, and the fully automatic machine pistols are uncommon in civilian usage due to generally poor recoil-controllability and strict laws and regulations governing their manufacture and sale.

Terminology
Technically speaking, the term "pistol" is a hypernym generally referring to a handgun and predates the existence of the type of guns to which it now applied as a specific term, that is: in colloquial usage it is used as a hyponym to specifically describe pistols with a single integral chamber within its barrel. The American Webster's Dictionary defines it as "a handgun whose chamber is integral with the barrel". This makes it distinct from the other types of handgun, such as the revolver, which has multiple chambers within a rotating cylinder that are separately aligned with a single barrel; and the derringer, which is a short pocket gun often with multiple single-shot barrels and no reciprocating action. The Bureau of Alcohol, Tobacco, Firearms, and Explosives (ATF) legally defines the term "pistol" as "a weapon originally designed, made, and intended to fire a projectile (bullet) from one or more barrels when held in one hand, and having: a chamber(s) as an integral part(s) of, or permanently aligned with, the bore(s); and a short stock designed to be gripped by one hand at an angle to and extending below the line of the bore(s)", which includes derringers but excludes revolvers.

In contrast with modern colloquial usage, the term is technically synonymous with any handgun type, including all revolvers and derringers.  UK/Commonwealth usage, for instance, does not usually make distinction, particularly when the terms are used by the military.  For example, the official designation of the Webley Mk VI revolver was "Pistol, Revolver, Webley, No. 1 Mk VI". In contrast to the Merriam-Webster definition, the Oxford English Dictionary (a descriptive dictionary) describes "pistol" as "a small firearm designed to be held in one hand", which is similar to the Webster definition for "handgun"; and "revolver" as "a pistol with revolving chambers enabling several shots to be fired without reloading", giving its original form as "revolving pistol".

History and etymology

The pistol originates in the 16th century, when early handguns were produced in Europe.  The English word was introduced in ca. 1570 from the Middle French pistolet (ca. 1550).

The etymology of the French word pistolet is disputed. It may be from a Czech word for early hand cannons, píšťala ("whistle" or "pipe"), or alternatively from Italian pistolese, after Pistoia, a city renowned for Renaissance-era gunsmithing, where hand-held guns (designed to be fired from horseback) were first produced in the 1540s.

The first suggestion derives the word from Czech píšťala, a type of hand-cannon used in the Hussite Wars during the 1420s. The Czech word was adopted in German as pitschale, pitschole, petsole, and variants.

The second suggestion is less likely; the use of the word as a designation of a gun is not documented before 1605 in Italy, long after it was used in French and German. The Czech word is well documented since the Hussite Wars in the 1420s.

Action

Single-shot

Single-shot handguns were mainly seen during the era of flintlock and musket weaponry where the pistol was loaded with a lead ball and fired by a flint striker, and then later a percussion cap. This shot required a reload every time it was shot. However, as technology improved, so did the single-shot pistol. New operating mechanisms were created, and due to this, they are still made today. They are the oldest type of pistol, and are often used to hunt wild game. Additionally, their compact size compared to most other types of handgun makes them more concealable.

Revolver

With the development of the revolver, short for revolving pistol, in the 19th century, gunsmiths had finally achieved the goal of a practical capability for delivering multiple loads to one handgun barrel in quick succession. Revolvers feed ammunition via the rotation of a cartridge-filled cylinder, in which each cartridge is contained within its own ignition chamber, and is sequentially brought into alignment with the weapon's barrel by an indexing mechanism linked to the weapon's trigger (double-action) or its hammer (single-action). These nominally cylindrical chambers, usually numbering between five and eight depending on the size of the revolver and the size of the cartridge being fired, are bored through the cylinder so that their axes are parallel to the cylinder's axis of rotation; thus, as the cylinder rotates, the chambers revolve about the cylinder's axis.

Semi-automatic

After the revolver, the semi-automatic pistol was the next step in the development of the pistol. By avoiding multiple chambers—which need to be individually reloaded—semi-automatic pistols delivered faster rates of fire and required only a few seconds to reload, by pushing a button or flipping a switch, and the magazine slides out to be replaced by a fully-loaded one. In blowback-type semi-automatics, the recoil force is used to push the slide back and eject the shell (if any) so that the magazine spring can push another round up; then as the slide returns, it chambers the round. An example of a modern blowback action semi-automatic pistol is the Walther PPK. Blowback pistols are some of the more simply designed handguns. Many semi-automatic pistols today operate using short-recoil. This design is often coupled with the Browning type tilting barrel.

Machine pistol

A machine pistol is a pistol that is capable of burst-fire or fully automatic fire. The first machine pistol was produced by the Austro-Hungarian Empire in 1916, as the Steyr Repetierpistole M1912/P16, and the term is derived from the German word maschinenpistolen. Though it is often used interchangeably with submachine gun, a machine pistol is generally used to describe a weapon that is more compact than a typical submachine gun. 

How it works: The shooter will disable the safety switch and pull the trigger, but hold it unlike firing a normal semi-automatic. The handgun will fire one round, and recoils, and the high-capacity magazine spring pushes another round, and is chambered, and fired without any actions needed from the shooter. They are useful in situations where multiple bullets must be fired in quick succession with minimal effort.

Multi-barreled

Multi-barreled pistols, such as the Pepperbox, were common during the same time as single shot pistols. As designers looked for ways to increase fire rates, multiple barrels were added to all guns including pistols. One example of a multi-barreled pistol is the COP .357 Derringer.

Harmonica pistol
Around 1850, pistols such as the Jarre harmonica gun were produced that had a sliding magazine. The sliding magazine contained pinfire cartridges or speedloaders. The magazine needed to be moved manually in many designs, hence distinguishing them from semi-automatic pistols.

Lever-action

Lever action pistols are very rare, the most notable of which is the Volcanic pistol.

Gallery of evolution of pistols over 400 years

See also

Glossary of firearms terms
List of pistols
Pistol grip
Water gun, including water pistol and squirt gun

References

Handguns
 
16th-century introductions